The Dry Fork mine is a coal mine located 8 miles north of Gillette, Wyoming in the United States in the coal-rich Powder River Basin. The mine is an open pit mine that utilizes truck and shovel mining method to mine a low-sulfur, sub-bituminous coal that is used for domestic energy generation and shipped to customers via railroad. In 2011, the mine began supplying coal to the newly constructed Dry Fork power station that was constructed adjacent to the mine. The mine is currently owned and operated by Western Fuels Association.

As of 2009, Dry Fork had reserves of 330 mm tons of sub-bituminous coal and a maximum permitted production capacity of 15mm tons per year. Typical annual production has been in 5.2mm ton range for the last several years though. In 2008, the mine produced just over 5.2 million short tons of coal, making it the 37th-largest producer of coal in the United States.

The average quality of the coal shipped from Dry Fork is 8,050-8,200 BTU/lb, 0.20-0.42% Sulfur, 3.8-5.1% Ash, and 1.50% Sodium (of the ash). Train loading operations at the mine are done with a batch weigh bin system that is coupled to a "weigh-in-motion" track scale system. Silo capacity at the mine's rail loop, which can accommodate a single unit train, is 10,800 tons.

History

The Dry Fork mine shipped its first coal to members of the Western Fuels Association in 1990 and is run by Western Fuels-Wyoming an associate of Western Fuels. Since opening, Dry Fork has shipped 69.5mm tons of coal.

Production

References

External links 
Dry Fork Mine at tic-inc.com

Mines in Campbell County, Wyoming
Mines in Wyoming
Coal mines in the United States